Tom Tait (born October 18, 1958) is an American politician and businessman who was the 45th mayor of Anaheim, California from 2010 to 2018. He previously served on the Anaheim City Council beginning in 1995 to 2004 and served as Mayor Pro Tem from 2002 to 2003.

Tait was born in California and attended the University of Wyoming where he received his Bachelor of Science degree and then went on to earn a master's degree in Business Administration from Vanderbilt University with a Finance concentration, followed by a receiving a Juris Doctor degree from Vanderbilt in 1985. Tait is a member of the California State Bar, and is president of Tait & Associates, Inc. as well as Tait Environmental Services.  Tait and his wife, Julie, have four children and the pair has resided in Anaheim for 22 years.  Tait was a member of Toastmasters.

Electoral history

City Council

Mayor

References

External links 
 Tom Tait at ballotpedia.org
 Tom Tait at c-span.org

California Republicans
Mayors of Anaheim, California
California city council members
University of Wyoming alumni
Vanderbilt University alumni
California lawyers
Living people
21st-century American politicians
1958 births